Digimortal is the fourth studio album by American heavy metal band Fear Factory, released on April 24, 2001 by Roadrunner Records. It is a concept album and the final part of a trilogy that started with Demanufacture and continued with Obsolete, which it is the sequel to. It was the band's last album before officially breaking up in March 2002. Although Digimortal was not a commercial success, this was not given as reason for the band's breakup, which was instead said to be frontman Burton C. Bell's desire to "form a band that's more indie-rock-oriented". Fear Factory would officially reform in 2003, however, to begin work on their next album, Archetype. Digimortal was the last to feature founding guitarist and songwriter Dino Cazares for eight years until his return to the band in 2009.

Background and recording
In February 2000, Fear Factory reported working on their follow-up to Obsolete. No lyrics had been written and the band had decided to shift away from their typical approach to creating a record. They also wanted a less-produced sound and stated that the new album would not be concept-based as their previous two were. The latter would ultimately not hold true. Already, Alternative Press was describing it as one of the most anticipated albums of the year.

Digimortal was produced by longtime Fear Factory collaborator Rhys Fulber. The group had considered working with Bob Rock who declined. Toby Wright was also approached but was allegedly busy with a new Ozzy Osbourne record. The band began recording on October 1, 2000.

Burton C. Bell noted in an interview with Billboard that, when beginning the writing process, the band wished to evolve their sound. As such, they constantly reminded themselves of the word "simplification" in the pursuit of Fear Factory's progression. He added, "We don't need to play a song seven minutes long if we can get the idea across in four minutes." Digimortal would use a more melodic approach both musically and vocally than previous records while maintaining Fear Factory's heaviness. Bell described it as "definitely as intense as Demanufacture but with the groove of Obsolete, and there's a lot more melody."

The popular track "Linchpin" was originally titled "Lynchpin" and an unused early track listing is featured on The Best of Fear Factory. In a move uncharacteristic for the band, B-Real, of the rap group Cypress Hill, is featured as a guest vocalist on "Back the Fuck Up", contributing elements of hardcore hip hop; Cazares and Olde Wolbers had guested on Cypress Hill's 2000 album Skull & Bones. It is the only song on the album that is not written by the band.

Concept
While the band had initially decided to detour from their concept-based records, Digimortal would continue where Obsolete left off. Conceptually, the record contains a futuristic story about man and machine merging into one. The surviving humans and the machines realize they have to depend on each other if they are going to continue on. The title of the album is actually short for "Digital Mortality".

Touring and promotion
A limited edition digipak version of the album was released simultaneously with the standard version, with four extra tracks. Fear Factory performed on the 2001 SnoCore Tour early that year. Frontman Burton C. Bell noted the album concept as "circuitry is creating a new image of man" and related this as "perfect for the first tour of the millennium". The band was also scheduled to support Papa Roach on their Raid The Nation Tour in spring but the headliners had to cancel due to an injury. Fear Factory instead performed smaller venues close to the originally planned tour's schedule.

In the fall of 2001, the band co-headlined with Machine Head alongside ill Niño and Chimaira on the Roadrunner Road Rage Tour. Fear Factory departed for two shows to perform on the Cypress Hill Smoke Out tour featuring the likes of Deftones, Busta Rhymes, and Method Man. The October 6 date would have an extended lineup featuring all the bands from the Roadrunner Rage Tour.

Digimortal featured the single "Linchpin" which gained substantial radio play and had a music video. A portion of "Invisible Wounds (Dark Bodies)", was featured during the credits of Resident Evil as well as a mix on the soundtrack.

Reception

Digimortal was a commercial disappointment compared to the band's previous record. While its single "Linchpin" managed to chart, the album had only sold a reported 152,000 copies by March 2002. Digimortal received generally positive reviews. College Music Journal (4/9/01, p. 17) called the album "Demented disco" and that "Digimortal is cybercore: digitized, overdubbed metal with crunchy, machine-like production." Q magazine (5/01, p. 108) gave the album 3 stars out of 5 and called it "ethereal and breathtaking". Fan reaction was mixed, with some alienation stemming from the album's melodic simplicity and more radio friendly sound when compared to the band's other albums.

Track listing

Personnel

Band members
Burton C. Bell − lead vocals (credited as "Resonating Biodroid")
Dino Cazares − guitars ("Energized Riff Traumatizer")
Christian Olde Wolbers − bass ("Subsonic Assassin"), backing vocals ("Auxiliary Resonator")
Raymond Herrera − drums ("Automated Rhythmic Attacker")

Others
John Anonymous − pre-production
Robert Breen − assistant engineer
Huey Dee − pre-production
Rhys Fulber − producer, keyboards ("Force Activated Keyboards"), programming ("Mechanical Programming")
John Bechdel − keyboards ("Live Activated Keyboards"), programming ("Programming Engineered"), add. keyboards ("Additional Keys Generated") (11)
Malcolm Springer − arrangements ("Additional Pre-production Arrangements Supported")
Jordan Plotnikoff − vocals ("Child's Vox") (1)
Billy Sherwood − arrangements ("Harmony Vox Arrangements") (3, 6)
B-Real − effects ("Enhancements") (5), vocals ("Auxiliary Vox") (8)
Tom Jermann − artistic director
George Marino − mastering
Mike Plotnikoff − mixing, technical engineer
Oscar Ramirez − assistant engineer
Paul Silveira − engineer
Neil Zlozower − photography

Charts
Album - Billboard (United States)

Singles - Billboard (United States)

References

Fear Factory albums
2001 albums
Concept albums
Roadrunner Records albums
Albums produced by Rhys Fulber
Nu metal albums by American artists